The Men's 50 metre backstroke competition of the 2016 FINA World Swimming Championships (25 m) was held on 8 and 9 December 2016.

Records
Prior to the competition, the existing world and championship records were as follows.

Results

Heats
The heats were held at 10:06.

Semifinals
The semifinals were held at 19:51.

Semifinal 1

Semifinal 2

Final
The final was held at 19:32

References

Men's 50 metre backstroke